Konata Mannings (March 20, 1986 in Georgetown) is a Guyanese international football player who plays with Alpha United FC.

Career
Mannings began his professional career in 2004 for Pele FC in the GFF National Super League. He was loaned in 2007 to Italia Shooters of the Canadian Soccer League. He made his debut in a 4-0 victory in North York on May 20, 2007.

The following year he played with Caledonia AIA. During the 2008 TT Pro League season Mannings led Caledonia to finish third in the standings and helped them qualify for the Lucozade Sport Big Six. On May 27, 2009 the North York Astros  head coach Uğur Çimen announced the signing of Mannings for the 2009 season. He made his debut for the Astros in a 2-0 defeat to St. Catharines on June 3, 2009.  Mannings signed with G.S United Soccer club in 2013 in the Ontario Soccer League. He returned to play with Pele FC in 2014, and was loaned in 2015 to Alpha United FC.  Mannings was top scorer for Pele in the Kashif & Shanghai Cup 2015.

International career
Mannings scored his goal for Guyana on January 27, 2008 in a 2-2 tie against Saint Vincent and the Grenadines. He was selected represent Guyana at the 2008 Caribbean Championship, and was in the starting 11 for the first two games against Dominica and Suriname. He is a former Under-15, -17, -20, -21 and -23 levels team player, who scored six goals in twenty games. He played with the U-21 the Central American Qualifying for 2005 FIFA World Youth Championship and played Futsal for Guyana.

Personal life 
His father Keith "Sanjee" Mannings has previously served as his player agent and his mother Roxanne Keith works as housewife. His brother is the former Guyana national under-17 footballer and now Toronto based Reggae singer Matussala Mandela Mannings.

References

Living people
1986 births
Sportspeople from Georgetown, Guyana
Guyanese footballers
Guyanese expatriate footballers
Guyana international footballers
TT Pro League players
Morvant Caledonia United players
York Region Shooters players
Guyanese expatriate sportspeople in Canada
North York Astros players
Canadian Soccer League (1998–present) players
Guyanese expatriate sportspeople in Trinidad and Tobago
Expatriate footballers in Trinidad and Tobago
Alpha United FC players
Association football forwards
Pele FC players
Association football midfielders